Bergenia  (elephant-eared saxifrage, elephant's ears) is a genus of ten species of flowering plants in the family Saxifragaceae, native to central Asia, from Afghanistan to China and the Himalayan region.

Description
They are clump-forming, rhizomatous, evergreen perennials with a spirally arranged rosette of leaves 6–35 cm long and 4–15 cm broad, and pink flowers produced in a cyme. The leaves are large, leathery, ovate or cordate, and often have wavy or saw-toothed edges. For most of the year, the leaves have a glossy green colour, but in cooler climates, they turn red or bronze in the fall.  The flowers grow on a stem similar in colour to a rhubarb stalk and most varieties have cone-shaped flowers in varying shades of pink.  These can range from almost white to ruby red and purple.

The common names for Bergenia are pigsqueak (due to the sound produced when two leaves are rubbed together), elephant's ears (due to the shape of the leaves) and large rockfoil.

Bergenia is closely related to Mukdenia, Oresitrophe, Astilboides and Rodgersia.

The creator of the taxonomic genus name, Conrad Moench, honoured the German botanist and physician Karl August von Bergen by coining the name Bergenia in 1794.

Species

 Bergenia ciliata, including the cultivar Bergenia ciliata 'Superba'
 Bergenia crassifolia (syn. Bergenia cordifolia) is the most widely grown garden plant, especially the cultivar Bergenia cordifolia 'Purpurea.'  The species epithet crassifolia means thick-leaved, and cordifolia means cordate (heart-shaped) leaf (although the leaves may also be described as spoon-shaped).  It grows to about 30 cm tall. The leaves are winter hardy and change color in the range of rust brown to brown-red.  Other cultivars are Bergenia cordifolia 'Winterglut', Bergenia cordifolia 'Senior', and Bergenia crassifolia 'Autumn Red'.
 Bergenia emeiensis
 Bergenia ligulata
 Bergenia pacumbis
 Bergenia purpurascens is 30 - 40 cm tall and has carmine-red flowers.  The leaves are oval-shaped.
Bergenia purpurascens var. delavayi is ca. 50 cm tall with small leaves and rosy red flowers.
 Bergenia scopulosa
 Bergenia stracheyi with the cultivars Bergenia stracheyi 'Alba' and Bergenia stracheyi 'Afghanica'
 Bergenia tianquanensis

Cultivation
They prefer sun but will grow in shady areas as well. They do well in most soils, but moist, humus-rich soil is preferable. Exposure and dry soils tend to stunt growth, but can enhance the winter leaf colours. In areas with cold, strong winter winds, protection from the wind may be required. They are propagated by division or rooted rhizome sections.

Bergenia crassifolia, Bergenia cordifolia, and various hybrids are often grown in gardens, with several cultivars selected.

The following cultivars have gained the Royal Horticultural Society's Award of Garden Merit:-

B. cordifolia 'Rosa Zeiten' 
B. purpurascens 
B. purpurascens var. delavayi 
'Biedermeier' 
'Bressingham White' 
'Britten' 
'Claire Maxine' 
'Eden's Magic Giant' 
'Eric Smith' 
'Eroica' 
'Frau Holle'  (pale pink)
'Sunningdale' 
'Irish Crimson' 
'Morgenröte' 
'Pugsley's Pink' 
'Silberlicht' 
'Wintermärchen'

Pests and diseases
Bergenia are robust plants and generally free of problems, although vine weevil adults readily eat the edges of the leaves, resulting in an indented, 'notched' outline which can detract from the appearance of the plant.

Uses
Bergenin, C-glycoside of 4-O-methyl gallic acid, and its O-demethylated derivative norbergenin, are chemical compounds and drugs of Ayurveda, commonly known as Paashaanbhed. They can be isolated from Bergenia ciliata and Bergenia ligulata and from rhizomes of Bergenia stracheyi. It shows a potent immunomodulatory effect.

References

External links
Flora of China: Bergenia
Flora of Pakistan: Bergenia.

 
Garden plants
Saxifragaceae genera